Joep van de Rande (born 3 February 1997) is a Dutch football player. He plays for OSS '20 in the fourth-tier Derde Divisie.

Club career
He made his Eerste Divisie debut for FC Oss on 25 August 2017 in a game against FC Volendam.

References

External links
 

1997 births
People from Landerd
Living people
Dutch footballers
Association football defenders
TOP Oss players
Eerste Divisie players
Derde Divisie players
Footballers from North Brabant